Khvaja Mahmud-i Haydar was an Iranian statesman and military commander (sardar) who initially served the Timurid Empire, but shifted his allegiance to the Qara Qoyunlu after its ruler Jahan Shah captured his native city of Isfahan in 1452. Mahmud Haydar soon died afterwards.

References

Sources 
 
 

Officials of the Timurid Empire
Viziers of the Timurid Empire
Government officials of the Kara Koyunlu
15th-century Iranian people
1452 deaths
Year of birth unknown
Military personnel from Isfahan
Iranian military commanders